Street Love is an album by Lloyd

Street Love may also refer to:
Street Love (song)
"Street Love", song by	Biffy Clyro	2010
"Streetlove", song by	Lloyd	
"Street Love", song by	Olamide
Scarred (film), a 1984 American film also known as Street Love